The  Atlanta Falcons season was the franchise's 50th season in the National Football League and the first under new head coach Dan Quinn.

The Atlanta Falcons started the season 5–0, their best start since 2012. However, the Falcons would struggle throughout the rest of the season by losing eight of their remaining eleven games finishing at .500 for the first time in 10 years. After their Week 15 win at EverBank Field against the Jacksonville Jaguars, the Falcons managed to improve their record from last season. The highlight of the season was the team's Week 16 victory over their divisional rival Carolina Panthers who were 14–0 coming into the game. The Falcons thus denied the Panthers a perfect regular season, which would have made them the second team since the NFL expanded to a 16-game schedule to achieve that feat.

Offseason

Coaching staff changes

 On December 29, 2014 head coach Mike Smith was fired after back-to-back losing seasons.
 The Tampa Bay Buccaneers announced the hiring of Dirk Koetter as their new offensive coordinator.
 On January 15, 2015, the New York Jets announced the hiring of Joe Danna as their new defensive backs coach.
 On January 16, 2015, the Oakland Raiders announced the hiring of Mike Tice as their new offensive line coach.
 On January 18, 2015, the Falcons announced the hiring of Kyle Shanahan as their new offensive coordinator.
 On January 23, 2015, the Chicago Bears announced the hiring of Glenn Pires as their new linebackers coach.
 On January 24, 2015, the Falcons announced the hiring of Raheem Morris as their defensive backs coach and assistant head coach.
 On January 26, 2015, the Falcons announced the hiring of Richard Smith as their defensive coordinator.
 On January 25, 2015, the Falcons promoted Wade Harman Tight Ends Coach, formally the assistant offensive line coach.
 On January 29, 2015, the San Diego Chargers announced the hiring of Mike Nolan as their linebackers coach.
 On January 31, 2015, the San Francisco 49ers announced the hiring of Tim Lewis as their defensive backs coach.
 On February 2, 2015, Dan Quinn was hired as the Falcons' 16th head coach.
 On February 2, 2015, the Falcons announced the hiring of Chris Morgan as their offensive line coach.
 On February 3, 2015, the Falcons announced the hiring of Bobby Turner as their running backs coach.
 On February 3, 2015, the Falcons announced the hiring of Mike LaFleur as their offensive assistant.
 On February 3, 2015, the Falcons announced the hiring of Marquand Manuel as their defensive backs coach and senior defensive consultant.
 On February 4, 2015, the Tampa Bay Buccaneers announced the hiring of Andrew Weidinger as their offensive assistant.
 On February 4, 2015, the Falcons announced the hiring of Steve Scarnecchia as their assistant to head coach coach.
 On February 8, 2015, the Falcons announced the hiring of Jeff Ulbrich as their linebackers coach.
 On February 10, 2015, the Falcons announced the hiring of Matt LaFleur as their Quarterback coach.
 On February 10, 2015, the Falcons announced the hiring of Doug Mallory as their defensive Assistant & Linebackers coach.
 On February 10, 2015, the Falcons announced the hiring of Mike McDaniel as their offensive assistant.
 On February 10, 2015, the Falcons announced the hiring of Chad Walker as their defensive assistant & defensive backs coach.
 On February 10, 2015, the Falcons announced the hiring of Keith Carter as their assistant offensive line coach.

Free Agents

Re-signings

Team additions

Departures

2015 draft class

Notes
 The Falcons acquired an additional seventh-round selection (No. 249 overall) as part of a trade that sent the team's 2013 first-, third- and sixth-round selections to the St. Louis Rams.
 The Falcons were not rewarded with any compensatory picks this year.
 The Falcons traded their fifth- (No. 146 overall) and sixth-round (No. 185 overall) picks to the Minnesota Vikings in exchange for the Vikings' fifth-round selection (No. 137 overall).

Staff

Final roster

Preseason

Schedule

Regular season

Schedule

Game summaries

Week 1: vs. Philadelphia Eagles
With the win, the Falcons began their season 1–0.

Week 2: at New York Giants
The Giants would lead 20–17 with below 2 minutes left, but Atlanta was able to pull off the comeback, scoring with 1:14 remaining after Devonta Freeman took it in from a yard out. New York tried to come back, but the Falcons would force a turnover on downs to end the game.

With the win, Atlanta improved to 2–0.

Week 3: at Dallas Cowboys
The Falcons would trail 14–28 at one point, but they would pull off their second comeback in as many weeks, as they scored 25 unanswered points afterwards to ultimately win 39–28.

With the win, the Falcons improved to 3–0 for the first time since 2012.

Week 4: vs. Houston Texans
The Falcons routed the Texans 48–21 at home. Atlanta would build a 42–0 lead, but Houston put up a fight, as they would outscore Atlanta 21–6 for the remainder of the game. However, the Falcons still won in a blowout.

With the win, the Falcons improved to 4–0.

Week 5: vs. Washington Redskins
the Falcons would win this game in overtime against the Redskins. In overtime, the game was sealed away after Robert Alford returned an interception 59 yards for a touchdown to end the game.

With the win, Atlanta started 5–0 for the first time since 2012.

Week 6: at New Orleans Saints
The Falcons suffered their first loss of the season in New Orleans on Thursday Night Football. The Saints would lead the entire game. The Falcons would tie it, but that was the closest they would come to striking distance, as the Saints won 31–21.

With the loss, the Falcons fell to 5–1.

Week 7: at Tennessee Titans
With the win, the Falcons improved to 6–1.

Week 8: vs. Tampa Bay Buccaneers
With the loss, the Falcons fell to 6–2.

Week 9: at San Francisco 49ers
With the bitter loss, the Falcons fell to 6–3.

Week 11: vs. Indianapolis Colts
The Falcons would lead 21–7 at one point, but Indianapolis would rally to erase it after D'Qwell Jackson returned an interception 6 yards to tie it at 21. The Colts would eventually go down the field to win it with an Adam Vinatieri field goal from 43 yards with 52 seconds left.

With the loss, Atlanta fell to 6–4.

Week 12: vs. Minnesota Vikings
With the loss, the Falcons fell to 6–5.

Week 13: at Tampa Bay Buccaneers
With the loss, the Falcons fell to 6–6.

Week 14: at Carolina Panthers
The Falcons would suffer a blowout and shutout loss to undefeated Carolina. The Falcons would struggle all day, as the Panthers romped them 38–0, their worst shutout loss since 2004.

With the loss, the Falcons fell to 6–7. This is the first and only time they had been under .500 all season.

Week 15: at Jacksonville Jaguars
With the win, the Falcons improved to 7–7. They finished 3-1 vs AFC South.

Week 16: vs. Carolina Panthers

In a major upset win, the Atlanta Falcons defeated Carolina 20–13, spoiling the Panthers' run at a perfect season.  Unfortunately for the Falcons, they were eliminated from playoff contention due to the Minnesota Vikings' 49–17 win against the New York Giants later in the day.

Week 17: vs. New Orleans Saints
With the loss, the Falcons ended their season 8–8, and finished 1–5 against their division. For the first time since the 2013 season, they were swept by the New Orleans Saints who also finished their season with a 7-9 Record.

Statistics

Team leaders

Stats as of week 16.

Standings

Division

Conference

Notes

References

External links
 

Atlanta
Atlanta Falcons seasons
Atlanta Falcons